Ihme (in its upper course: Wennigser Mühlbach) is a river of Lower Saxony, Germany. It is a left tributary of the Leine.

Its source is in the village , a district of Wennigsen. In order to protect the city center of Hanover from flooding, much of the water of the Leine is rerouted by a ditch into the Ihme. A bridge over the Ihme is named in memory of Benno Ohnesorg.

The Ihme gives its name to the village Ihme, that forms together with Roloven the district  of Ronnenberg.

See also
List of rivers of Lower Saxony

References

Rivers of Lower Saxony
Federal waterways in Germany
Rivers of Germany